2011 Rugby World Cup qualifying began at the 2007 tournament in France, where twelve teams (the first three in each of the four pools) earned a place in the finals of the tournament, this automatically qualified them for the 2011 Rugby World Cup in New Zealand.

After much speculation, it was confirmed on 30 November 2007 that 20 teams would contest the next edition of the tournament. The qualification system for the remaining eight places was region-based, with Europe and the Americas allocated two qualifying places, Africa, Asia and Oceania one place each, and the last place determined by a playoff.

With 79 teams participating in regional qualifying competitions, and 12 teams qualifying automatically, 91 nations were involved in the process.

Qualified teams
Africa
 (Africa 1)
 (automatic qualifier/champion)
Americas
 (automatic qualifier)
 (Americas 1)
 (Americas 2)
Asia
 (Asia 1)
Europe
 (automatic qualifier)
 (automatic qualifier)
 (Europe 1)
 (automatic qualifier) 
 (automatic qualifier)
 (Europe 2)
 (repechage)
 (automatic qualifier)
 (automatic qualifier)
Oceania
 (automatic qualifier)
 (automatic qualifier/host)
 (automatic qualifier)
 (automatic qualifier)
 (Oceania 1)

Regional qualifiers
Eight nations qualified from regional competitions: seven qualified directly through their region, and the eighth from a four-nation repechage play-off for the final spot.

Final place play-off

The twentieth place at the 2011 tournament was determined by a repechage play-off which involved the third-place teams from the American and European qualifying tournaments (Uruguay and Romania). On a home and away basis, Romania prevailed by winning 32–12 in Bucharest, preceded by a 21–21 draw in Montevideo. It competed in Pool B.

Both nations had won the repechage semi-finals. Those were conducted as single matches, with the European and African qualifiers drawn into one semi-final and the Asian and Americas qualifiers drawn into the other. Romania beat Tunisia 56–13 and Uruguay had the upper hand over Kazakhstan winning 44–7. Both matches were hosted by the team with the higher IRB World Ranking when the two teams to play became known.

Sources

External links
RWC 2011 qualifying overview. IRB.com
2011 Rugby World Cup Qualifier, Repechage – Bucharest, 27 November 2010. ESPN
2011 Rugby World Cup Qualifier, Repechage – Montevideo, 13 November 2010.  ESPN